The Treachery of Images is a 1929 painting by Belgian surrealist painter René Magritte. It is also known as This Is Not a Pipe and The Wind and the Song. Magritte painted it when he was 30 years old. It is on display at the Los Angeles County Museum of Art.

The painting shows an image of a pipe. Below it, Magritte painted, "", French for "This is not a pipe".

The theme of pipes with the text "Ceci n'est pas une pipe" is extended in Les Mots et Les Images, La Clé des Songes, Ceci n'est pas une pipe (L'air et la chanson), The Tune and Also the Words, Ceci n’est pas une pomme, and Les Deux Mystères.

The painting is sometimes given as an example of meta message conveyed by paralanguage, like Alfred Korzybski's "The word is not the thing" and "The map is not the territory", as well as Denis Diderot's This is not a story. 

On December 15, 1929, Paul Éluard and André Breton published an essay about poetry in La Révolution surréaliste (The Surrealist Revolution) as a reaction to the publication by poet Paul Valéry "Notes sur la poésie" in Les Nouvelles littéraires of September 28, 1929. When Valéry wrote "Poetry is a survival", Breton and Éluard made fun of it and wrote "Poetry is a pipe", as a reference to Magritte's painting.

In the same edition of La Révolution surréaliste, Magritte published "Les mots et les images" (his founding text which illustrated where words play with images), his answer to the survey on love, and Je ne vois pas la [femme] cachée dans la forêt, a painting tableau surrounded by photos of sixteen surrealists with their eyes closed, including Magritte himself.

See also

References

Further reading 
 Allmer, Patricia. René Magritte: Beyond Painting, Manchester University Press, 2009. .
 Harkness, James, ed. Michel Foucault: This Is Not a Pipe, University of California Press, 2008. .

External links 

 

Paintings by René Magritte
1929 paintings
Collection of the Los Angeles County Museum of Art
Paradoxes
Rhetorical techniques